The Metropolitan Police Act 1933 was an Act of Parliament initiated by the Parliament of the United Kingdom. It was largely the brainchild of Hugh Trenchard, who served as Metropolitan Police Commissioner from 1931 to 1935. He instigated changes for the improvement of police residences known as section houses, following various reports instigated during 1932. The report proposed sweeping changes and indirectly called into question the reliability of the police in a major emergency.  After adverse reactions in the press and questions in Parliament, the Home Secretary Sir John Gilmour stated that Trenchard's report would be published as a White Paper, giving MPs an opportunity to debate the issues. In very quick order the White Paper was turned into a Government Bill.  The first two clauses of the Bill, which proposed to increase the number of assistant commissioners from four to five and lower the age of retirement for senior officers, did not prove too controversial.  However, the clauses which set out limitations on membership of the Police Federation were hotly debated and characterized by left-wing politicians as "fascist".  Additionally, the proposed introduction of ten-year employment terms for some new constables was met with considerable opposition.  The bill was enacted in 1933 as the Metropolitan Police Act.

Notes

References

United Kingdom Acts of Parliament 1933
English criminal law
Police legislation in the United Kingdom